Khwaja Mahmood al-Anjir al-Faghnawi founded Naqshbandi, one of the largest Sufi Muslim orders.

Birth 
Mahmood Anjir Faghnawi was born in Bukhara, Uzbekistan. He was reported to have been from the lineage of the Islamic prophet, Muhammad. He devoted his life to guiding people to Allah's presence.

Biography
After he stayed for a short time in his village, he moved to Walken. There, he earned his livelihood as a builder. He started the training with the Arif Riwgari, there completing his Sayr-U Suluk (or religious training), and becoming his successor. For years he guided the people in the masjid of Wabkent and trained his students. It was said his face was always smiling and filled with light. During his last days, Arif Riwgari permitted Mahmood Anjir Faghnawi to perform dhikr, or devotional prayer. As a requirement of the times and in accordance with the state of his students, he spent most of his time performing dhikr.

Death
It is estimated that Anjir Faghnawi died in the hijri year 715 or 717 (1317AD) 17 Rabi-Ul-Awwal. His tomb is located in the village of Anjirbag, in the suburb of Wabkent in Bukhara. Next to his tomb, there is a masjid and a well and it is believed that this water has healing properties.

References

Naqshbandi order
1231 births
1317 deaths